Michael Hickey (6 August 1911 – 22 July 1998) was an Irish hurler who played as a goalkeeper and as a right wing-back for the Waterford senior team. He was the nephew of Michael O'Hickey.

Born in Portlaw, County Waterford, Hickey first arrived on the inter-county scene as a member of the Waterford junior team. Hickey subsequently became a regular member of the starting fifteen of the Waterford senior team and won one All-Ireland medal.

At club level Hickey was a one-time championship medallist with Portlaw.

Honours

Team
Portlaw
Waterford Senior Football Championship (1): 1937

Waterford
All-Ireland Senior Hurling Championship (1): 1948
Munster Junior Hurling Championship (1): 1936

References

1911 births
1998 deaths
Portlaw hurlers
Waterford inter-county hurlers
Munster inter-provincial hurlers
All-Ireland Senior Hurling Championship winners
Hurling goalkeepers